The Alchemist's Euphoria is the seventh studio album by British band Kasabian, released on 12 August 2022 through Sony Music. It is Kasabian's first album in five years, following For Crying Out Loud (2017), and first to feature Serge Pizzorno as a sole lead vocalist after former frontman Tom Meighan was fired in 2020 amid his domestic assault conviction. It is also their first album to feature guitarist Tim Carter as a permanent member, who contributed to all of the band's albums since West Ryder Pauper Lunatic Asylum in 2009, and joined the band in 2013 as a touring guitarist.

The album was produced by Pizzorno and Fraser T. Smith and preceded by four singles—"Alygatyr", "Scriptvre", "Chemicals" and "The Wall". The band will tour in support of the album from late 2022.

The album's release was pushed back by a week from 5 August 2022 due to vinyl manufacturing issues.

Background
Former frontman Tom Meighan parted ways with the band in July 2020, and the following day pleaded guilty to assaulting his then-fiancée, now-wife Vikki Ager. Pizzorno, previously the lead guitarist and occasional lead vocalist in the band, then took over sole lead vocal duties.

The album was primarily recorded at Pizzorno's home studio, the Sergery, in Leicester. About the album, Pizzorno stated that it "takes some pretty obscure turns" and has a "big, epic sound but with a personal touch as well. There are some softer edges alongside the massive parts. As a whole, it's a beautiful thing and the most cohesive record we've ever made. It's an emotional trip."

Critical reception

The Alchemist's Euphoria received a score of 74 out of 100 from nine critics' reviews on review aggregator Metacritic, indicating "generally favorable" reception. David Smyth of the Evening Standard wrote that Meighan "was never the most remarkable singer [...] so he's not particularly missed on record", although felt that Pizzorno "will need to grow in stature" to "control" the crowds the band performs to. Smyth described the album as "punchy", writing that "Scriptvre" has "crunching breakbeats and snarling guitars" and "Rocket Fuel" is "a bit silly really, with its mix of rave synths and chanted vocals". Reviewing the album for The Guardian, Michael Hann felt that the album "goes for broke" and "teems with ideas that don't always land", and despite Pizzorno's "imagination elevat[ing] them above their lad-rock leanings", as a vocalist he is "adequate but unremarkable". Hann found The Alchemist's Euphoria "offers up some of the bullish, uptempo rock that sets moshpits roiling. It is generally pretty good fun, too."

Track listing

On digital services, "Alygatyr" is only 3:23 due to the single version being supplied instead of the album version.

Personnel

Kasabian
Sergio Pizzorno – vocals, guitars, bass, synthesizers, piano, drum programming, production (tracks 6, 9, 11 and 12), mixing (tracks 6, 9, 10, 11 and 12)
Chris Edwards – bass guitar, backing vocals
Ian Matthews – drums, percussion
Tim Carter – guitar, organ, additional percussion, drum programming, additional production and programming (tracks 6, 9, 11 and 12), mixing (tracks 6, 9, 10, 11 and 12)

Additional musicians 
Fraser T. Smith – additional keyboard, bass and drum programming

Production and design
Fraser T. Smith – engineering
Mark "Spike" Stent – mixing (tracks 1, 2, 3, 4, 5, 7 and 8)
Stephen McLaughlin – mixing (tracks 6, 9, 10, 11 and 12)
John Coyne – management
Simon Moran – management
Noel Fielding – cover and back cover painting
Yasmina Aoun – design
Alex Bois – design

Charts

References

2022 albums
Kasabian albums
Albums produced by Fraser T. Smith
Albums produced by Sergio Pizzorno